"Today I Sing the Blues" is a song written by Curtis Lewis and performed by Aretha Franklin.  The song reached number 10 on the U.S. R&B chart in 1960.  The song appeared on her 1961 album, Aretha. The song was produced by John Hammond. Franklin re-recorded the song in 1969 on the album Soul '69 and it reached number 101 on the U.S. pop chart.  It also charted on the Cash Box Top 100 chart.

"Today I Sing the Blues", originally written in 1948 and recorded the same year by Helen Humes and Buck Clayton's Orchestra, was included in the second album of Sam Cooke, Encore, recorded in 1958.

Chart performance

Aretha Franklin

Cover versions
In 2012, Christine Anu covered the song on her album Rewind: The Aretha Franklin Songbook.

References

1960 songs
1960 singles
1969 singles
Aretha Franklin songs
Columbia Records singles
Jazz songs
Song recordings produced by John Hammond (record producer)